
This is a list of aircraft in alphabetical order beginning with 'To'.

To

Toczołowski-Wułw
(Henryk Toczołowski and Józef Wulf)
 Toczołowski-Wułw TW-12

Todd 
(Edgar B Todd, Douglas, WY, 1929: Pueblo, CO)
 Todd 1924 Monoplane
 Todd Cirrus Special aka Todd-Alexander Racer
 Todd Light Express
 Todd Sport Trainer

Todd 
(Edward Todd, Madison, WI)
 Todd Special

Tøjhusværkstederne
(Tøjhusværkstederne - depot)
 D.K.I
 D.K.II
 Tøjhusværkstederne- Orlogsværftet H-Maskine

Tokorozawa 
(Tokorozawa Aviation School)
 Tokorozawa Koshiki-2

Tokyo 
(Tokyo Koku KK - Tokyo Aviation Company Ltd.)
 Tokyo Koku Aiba-Tsubame 6
 Tokyo Koku Aiba-Tsubame 7
 Tokyo Koku Aiba-Tsubame 8
 Tokyo Koku Aiba 10
 Tokyo Koku Aiba 11
 Tokyo Koku Ki-107
 Tokyo Koku LXG1

Tokyo Gasu Denki 
see: Gasuden

Tokyo University 
(Tokyo Teikoku Deigaku - Tokyo Imperial University)
 Tokyo University LB-2
 Tokyo Imperial University Igo-1-C

Tomalesky 
((Peter) Tomalesky Aviation, Umatilla, FL)
 Tomalesky TC-1
 Tomalesky TF-1 Tomcat

Tomark 
(Tomark s.r.o., Prešov, Slovakia)
 Tomark SD-4 Viper
 Tomark Skyper GT9

Tomashevich 
(Dmitri Lyudvigovich Tomashevich)
 Tomashevich 110
 Tomashevich Pegas

To-Mi Aviation
(Labem, Czech Republic)
To-Mi Cross-5
To-Mi Dolphin-3
To-Mi Eco-6

Topliff 
(Oliver Topliff, Springfield, IL)
 Topliff Model A Quail

Torigai 
(Shigesaburo Torigai)
 Torigai Hayabusa-go

Towle 
(Towle Aircraft Co., Detroit, MI)
 Towle TA-1
 Towle TA-2
 Towle TA-3
 Towle WC Amphibion

Townsend 
(Gid Townsend, Ocala, FL)
 Townsend Thunderbird

Townsend 
(K R Townsend, Tulsa, OK)
 Townsend A-1 Special

Toyo 
(Toyo Aircraft Manufacturing Co. (Toyo Koku Kabushiki Kaisha))
 Toyo T-T.10

Toyota 
 Toyota Model 191-4
 Toyota TAA-1
 Toyota TAA-2

Toys 4 Boys
 Toys 4 Boys JC 100

References

Further reading

External links 

 List of aircraft (T)